William Gilbert Steel (6 February 1908 – 1990) was a Scottish footballer who played in the English Football League for Liverpool, Birmingham and Derby County.

Life and playing career
Born in Blantyre, Lanarkshire, Steel played for Bridgeton Waverley and St Johnstone before being signed by Liverpool manager George Patterson in September 1931. He made his debut on 19 December 1931 in a Football League First Division match at Anfield. Derby County were the visitors and they returned to the Baseball Ground with a point following a 1–1 draw.

Steel broke into the team at full-back three months after signing, and stayed there for the rest of the season missing just one game. He followed this up with an ever-present season in 1932–33 and missed just two games of the next campaign.

He had established himself as the first choice right-back until during the 1934–35 season he lost the position to Robert Done. Done lasted for only one match, but instead of being replaced by Steel it was Tom Cooper who slotted in to the position.

Steel was allowed to leave during March 1935 when he joined Birmingham. He subsequently went on to play for Derby County before ending his career, with a guest spell at Dumbarton during World War II.

After the war, he was manager of Airdrieonians for nine years, then Third Lanark for one year.

Career details

References

1908 births
1990 deaths
Date of death missing
People from Blantyre, South Lanarkshire
Footballers from South Lanarkshire
Scottish footballers
Association football fullbacks
Bridgeton Waverley F.C. players
St Johnstone F.C. players
Liverpool F.C. players
Birmingham City F.C. players
Derby County F.C. players
Dumbarton F.C. wartime guest players
Scottish Junior Football Association players
Scottish Football League players
English Football League players
Scottish football managers
Airdrieonians F.C. (1878) managers
Third Lanark A.C. managers
Scottish Football League managers